Katharine Ellis,  is a British musicologist and academic, specialising in music history. Since 2017, she has been the 1684 Professor of Music at the University of Cambridge. She previously taught at the Open University, at Royal Holloway, University of London and at the School of Advanced Study, University of London, before serving as Stanley Hugh Badock Professor of Music at the University of Bristol (2013–2017).

Early life and education
Ellis studied at University College, Oxford, graduating with Bachelor of Arts (BA) and Doctor of Philosophy (DPhil) degrees. She also studied the violin at the Guildhall School of Music.

Academic career
Ellis's first post in her academic career was as a junior research fellow in French studies at St Anne's College, Oxford Then, from 1991 to 1994, she lectured with the Open University. In 1994, she joined Royal Holloway, University of London as a lecturer. She was additionally the inaugural Director of the Institute of Musical Research, which was then based at the School of Advanced Study, University of London, between February 2006 and July 2009.

In 2013, Ellis joined the University of Bristol as its next Stanley Hugh Badock Professor of Music. She gave her inaugural lecture on 13 February 2014. In August 2016, it was announced that she would be the next 1684 Professor of Music at the University of Cambridge, in succession to Nicholas Cook. She took up the chair in June 2017, and was also elected a Fellow of Selwyn College, Cambridge.

Research
Ellis's research centres on the cultural history of music in France in the long nineteenth century. She also has interests in musical tastes and practices, women's musical careers, music criticism, and music in fiction.

Honours
In 2010, Ellis was elected a Member of the Academia Europaea. In 2013, she was elected a Fellow of the British Academy (FBA), the United Kingdom's national academy for the humanities and social sciences. Ellis was elected in 2017 to the American Philosophical Society.

Selected works

References

 

 
 
 
 
 
 

Living people
Year of birth missing (living people)
Women musicologists
20th-century British musicologists
21st-century musicologists
British music historians
Academics of the Open University
Academics of Royal Holloway, University of London
Academics of the University of Bristol
Members of the University of Cambridge Faculty of Music
Fellows of the British Academy
Members of Academia Europaea
Academics of the School of Advanced Study
Alumni of University College, Oxford
Alumni of the Guildhall School of Music and Drama
Fellows of Selwyn College, Cambridge
Fellows of St Anne's College, Oxford
Members of the American Philosophical Society
British women historians
Professors of Music (Cambridge)